Unto a Good Land is a novel by Vilhelm Moberg from 1952. It is the second part of The Emigrants series.

Plot
This novel describes the journey of the Emigrants from New York City, New York to Taylors Falls, Minnesota. They settle at the lake Ki-Chi-Saga (now Lake Chisago) in what is today Chisago County, and start building their home. Robert, Karl-Oskar's brother, takes off to California with Arvid in search for gold.

1952 novels
Novels by Vilhelm Moberg
Swedish-language novels
Novels about immigration to the United States
Works about Swedish-American culture